Unforgettable is a 2019 Filipino drama film starring Sarah Geronimo, directed by Perci Intalan and Jun Robles Lana. The film was released in cinemas on October 23, 2019 under Viva Films. It also stars the celebrity dog Milo, Gina Pareño, Ara Mina, Meg Imperial and Kim Molina. Sarah Geronimo won Best Actress Award at the 4th Guild of Educators, Mentors, and Students (GEMS) Hiyas ng Sining Awards.

Cast

Main cast
 Sarah Geronimo as Jasmine
 Milo as Happy

Supporting cast
 Gina Pareño as Lola Olive
 Ara Mina as Dahlia 
 Yayo Aguila as Nanette
 Kim Molina as Chuchay
 Meg Imperial as Violet
 Caleb Santos

Special participation
 Tirso Cruz III as Lola Olive's doctor
 Anne Curtis as Nurse Gem
 Cherie Gil
 Regine Velasquez-Alcasid as Janet
Alessandra de Rossi
 Marco Gumabao as Happy's doctor
 Dennis Padilla as a taxi driver 
Delfin Geronimo
Empoy Marquez 
Precious Anika Reuyan as marketer

References 

2019 films
Films about dogs
Philippine drama films
Films directed by Jun Robles Lana
Films directed by Perci Intalan